Underoos is a brand of underwear primarily for children, produced by the Fruit of the Loom company. The packages include a matching top and bottom for either boys or girls, featuring a character from popular entertainment media, especially superhero comics, animated programs, and fantasy/science fiction.  Typically, the garment mimics the distinctive costume of the character, encouraging the wearer to pretend to be the character.  In other designs, it features an image of the character or logo on the undergarments.

History

Underoos were developed as a product idea in 1977 by an independent entrepreneur, Larry Weiss, who obtained licenses for the four major comic character groups (DC Comics, Marvel Comics, Hanna-Barbera, Archie Comics) which included Superman, Batman, Shazam, Wonder Woman, Supergirl, Spider-Man, and Captain America. 

The product idea was first offered to Hanes, but was rejected. Scott Paper company pursued development, but ultimately decided to not market the product.  Fruit of the Loom had been engaged as supplier of the blank underwear and another vendor engaged to apply transfers. Informed of Scott Paper Company's decision to not market this novel product, Fruit of the Loom inquired if they would be permitted to market the product, now fully developed. Weiss agreed, and in 1978 Fruit of the Loom bought Underoos. 

Early advertisements for the brand featured images of boys and girls in wrestler poses with the marketing slogan "When the color lasts, and the fit lasts, and the quality lasts, and the joy lasts, it's got to be Underoos...the underwear that's fun to wear." 

The product was tested in three markets including the New York Metropolitan area. Retailer and consumer demand was so strong the product was immediately expanded to national distribution. 

Fruit of the Loom has licensed out the Underoos brand name to Bioworld, which is currently making Underoos in adult sizes.

In pop culture

Marvel Cinematic Universe
In Captain America: Civil War, Iron Man shouts out "Underoos" at Spider-Man as a signal for the teenager to join the superhero confrontation and steal Captain America's shield. The nickname references Spider-Man's youth and suit. The Underoos reference resulted in numerous memes circulating online and being compiled into collections inspired by the movie scene.

Due to the product being sold predominately in America and being unfamiliar internationally, the brand name Underoos was exchanged for relevant regional meanings during the movie's translations. Some of the alternative names shouted by Iron Man to Spider-Man include the nicknames collants (French), pirralho (Portuguese), pijamalı çocuk (Turkish), joljori (Korean), and rugdalózós (Hungarian).

Styles

 The A-Team
 Alvin and the Chipmunks
 Aquaman
 Archies - Veronica
 Archies - Archie
 Barbie
 Batgirl
 Batman
 Boba Fett
 Buck Rogers
 C-3PO
 Captain America
 Captain Power and the Soldiers of the Future
 Catwoman
 Chewbacca
 Darth Vader
 Deadpool
 Defenders of the Earth
 Despicable Me
 Disney's Adventures of the Gummi Bears
 Dukes of Hazzard - Bo & Luke
 Dukes of Hazzard - Daisy
 E.T. the Extra-Terrestrial
 Ewoks
 The Flash
 G.I. Joe
 GoBots
 Green Lantern
 Gremlins
 Han Solo
 Harry Potter - Gryffindor
 Harry Potter - Hufflepuff
 Harry Potter - Ravenclaw
 Harry Potter - Slytherin
 He-Man
 Hot Rod
 The Incredible Hulk
 Iron Man
 The Joker
 The Séance (Klaus Hargreeves) 
 Knight Rider
 Lazer Tag Academy
 Lone Ranger
 Luke Skywalker - Return of the Jedi
 Luke Skywalker (Flight Suit)
 M.A.S.K.
 Monchhichis
 Ms. Pac-Man
 Pac-Man
 Peanuts
 Plastic Man
 Power Rangers - Green Ranger
 Power Rangers - Pink Ranger
 Princess Leia - Return of the Jedi
 Princess Leia - The Empire Strikes Back
 Punisher
 R2-D2
 The Real Ghostbusters
 Robin
 Roger Rabbit
 Scooby-Doo
 Shazam
 Spider-Man
 Spider-Woman (Jessica Drew)
 Stormtrooper
 Supergirl
 Superman
 Teenage Mutant Ninja Turtles
 The Thing
 Thundercats
 Tonto
 Transformers
 Twiki
 Wonder Woman
 Yoda

References
Notes

External links
 Underoos Official site

Products introduced in 1977
Berkshire Hathaway
Children's underwear
Underwear brands